Heritage High School is a public school located in Littleton, Colorado, United States. It was established in 1972 as the last of three high schools in the Littleton Public Schools system. It was rated by Newsweek magazine  as one of the top 200 high schools in the US, and the Denver-based 5280 magazine  acknowledged Heritage High School as one of the best schools in the Denver area. The school colors are scarlet and silver. The mascot is the bald eagle.

History 
Established in 1972, Heritage is the newest of the three high schools within Littleton Public Schools.  The other two are Littleton High School (opened in its present location in 1956) and Arapahoe High School (established in 1964). The school's mascot is the Eagle, and the school's colors are scarlet and silver (with navy serving as the third school color).

In 2006, the Heritage High School Community Relations Committee sent a delegation to Sierra Leone to explore how the school could aid the country. Over three years, the school raised $60,000 to start a school, Heritage of Kabala, in Kabala, Sierra Leone. The school opened in 2009 and the Littleton school continues to have a relationship with their sister school through fundraising and service trips.

Campus

Location
It is two miles north of highway C-470 between South Broadway and Santa Fe Avenue. It is located at a latitude of N. 39 degrees 35' 13.685" and a longitude of W. 105 degrees 0.0625".

Building
The school contains  divided between three levels.
The theatre seats 735 people and the main gymnasium seats a bit less.
The library (also known as the Integrated Learning Center, ILC) is located on the first floor near the business and art departments. It includes two computer labs as well as 12 computer workstations for student use.
Every floor has an interdisciplinary faculty office adjacent to the department classrooms and resource centers.
The school has two lecture halls located on the second and third floors. These lecture halls accommodate approximately 100 people for large meetings or presentations.
The student store, located in the Student Center, is maintained and run by students involved in the Distributive Education Clubs of America (DECA).
In addition to the computer lab in the technology area, the school also houses two more computer labs within the business department.
In addition to the main gymnasium, the school also houses an auxiliary gym, a weight room, a climbing wall, an indoor turf room a fitness center and an indoor pool. Outside the school are four tennis courts, a turf football field, an all-weather track, a soccer field, and a baseball field.
Remodeling during the summers of 2005 and 2006, updated departmental offices, improved the school's HVAC system, new fire and security systems, added water sprinklers, moved the library to the first floor, remodeled the entire business department, added new varsity lockers rooms above the existing west locker room, added an auxiliary gym, updated existing locker rooms, remodeled the administrative and counseling offices, updated all restrooms, and replaced lockers throughout the building. The cost of the remodel was approximately $14.5 million.

Athletics

Rivals
Arapahoe High School
Littleton High School

State Championships

Notable alumni

 Nate Field, former MLB player (Kansas City Royals, Colorado Rockies, Florida Marlins)
 Luke French, MLB player for the Detroit Tigers
 Laura Fraser, journalist, New York Times-bestselling author of An Italian Affair and other books
 April Heinrichs, United States Soccer Development Director for Women's Soccer
 Ross Marquand, actor
 David Miller, operatic tenor and member of Il Divo
 Janice Min, former editor of Us Weekly and editorial director of The Hollywood Reporter
 Marc Munford, NFL player
 Tom Rouen, former NFL punter Denver Broncos
 Eli Saslow, writer for The Washington Post and winner of a Pulitzer Prize in 2014
 Steve Spangler, television personality, author and science teacher
 Matt Stone, co-creator of South Park
 Danny Dietz, Navy SEAL, Operation Redwings, documented in book and film 'Lone Survivor'
 Daniel Baer, former U.S. Ambassador to the Organization of Security and Co-operation in Europe
 Cody Melphy, player for the United States national rugby sevens team and competitor in the 2020 Summer Olympics

References

External links
 

Littleton, Colorado
Public high schools in Colorado
Educational institutions established in 1972
Schools in Arapahoe County, Colorado